Eukaryotic translation initiation factor 2-alpha kinase 3, also known as protein kinase R (PKR)-like endoplasmic reticulum kinase (PERK), is an enzyme that in humans is encoded by the EIF2AK3 gene.

Function 

The protein encoded by this gene phosphorylates the alpha subunit of eukaryotic translation-initiation factor 2 (EIF2), leading to its inactivation, and thus to a rapid reduction of translational initiation and repression of global protein synthesis. It is a type I membrane protein located in the endoplasmic reticulum (ER), where it is induced by ER stress caused by malfolded proteins.

Clinical significance 

Patients with mutations in this gene develop Wolcott-Rallison syndrome.

Interactions 

EIF2AK3 has been shown to interact with DNAJC3, NFE2L2, and endoplasmic reticulum chaperone BiP (Hsp70).

Inhibitors
 GSK2606414
 3-Fluoro-GSK2606414

References

Further reading 

 
 
 
 
 
 
 
 
 
 
 
 
 
 
 
 
 

EC 2.7.11